WLKR (1510 AM) – branded 92.9 WLKR Classic – is a commercial daytime-only classic hits radio station licensed to serve Norwalk, Ohio, covering the Norwalk/Sandusky/Port Clinton market (collectively referred to as Vacationland and/or the Firelands), including Erie and Huron counties. Owned by Elyria-Lorain Broadcasting Co., the WLKR studios are located in Milan, while the station transmitter resides near the intersection of Huber Road and Lamereaux Road just outside of Norwalk. In addition to a standard analog transmission, WLKR simulcasts over low-power analog Norwalk translator W225DG (92.9 FM), and is also available online.

History
WLKR first signed on the air on March 18, 1968 as the AM adjunct to WLKR-FM, which had begun broadcasting four years earlier. The AM station became WVAC on January 28, 1991 (for the "VACationland"), and switched back to WLKR on May 30, 2002.

WLKR carried Westwood One's adult standards format known as "America's Best Music" until December 2004, when it switched to oldies music from Westwood One's "Oldies Channel" format. WLKR switched to sports talk in August 2006, programmed exclusively with ESPN Radio as "ESPN 1510 WLKR".

WLKR's current classic hits format was adopted in late August 2010 as "Kool Gold 1510 WLKR," taking its branding from former syndicator Dial Global's Kool Gold format (now known as Westwood One's classic hits format). After adding an FM translator in August 2019, the station was re-branded as "92.9 WLKR Classic."

FM translator

References

External links

FM translator

Oldies radio stations in the United States
LKR
Radio stations established in 1968
1968 establishments in Ohio
LKR